Pressurecooker is a 1997 film directed by Bradley Null and written by Christopher Null.

External links

1997 films
1997 short films
American short films